Lawan Ahmad is a Nigerian actor, filmmaker and producer. He his a product of "FKD FILM PRODUCTION", he came into a limelight through the contribution of Ahmed S Nuhu.

Biography 
Lawan Yahaya Ahmad was born in Bakori local government area of Katsina state on 13 March 1982. He attended his primary school at Nadabo Primary school Bakori, from 1987 to 1993. He proceeded Government Day Secondary School, Bakori, for his junior secondary school education, and he obtained his Senior Secondary Certificate Examination (SSCE) at Government Day Secondary School, Sharada, from 1994 to 2000.

He pursued his tertiary education at Federal College Of Education, Kano, from 2002 to 2004. He also attended Yusif Maitama Sule University Kano, from 2016 to 2017.

The actor has enrolled into the Kannywood Film Industry in a year (1999) and he started appearing in a movie [SIRADI] which happened to be his first Movie.

Selected filmography 
 Zuma
 Sharhi
 Bakace
 Kolo
 Taraliya
 Sansani
 Sai wata rana
 Wasila 2010
 Haske
 Kalamu wahid
 Siradi
 Maya
 Muradin Kaina
 Ni da kai da shi
 Shanya
 Bani ba ke
 Abun da kayi
 Hauwa kulu
 mazaje 2
 bazan barkiba
 sabon sarki
 kolo
 saiwata rana 2010
 ya salam
 ranar haduwa
 saimai mota
 noir (the light)
 naso kaina
 jani jani
 nida kai dashi

References

External links 

1982 births
Living people
Nigerian film actors